Sanchai Ratiwatana and Sonchat Ratiwatana were the defending champions but decided not to participate.
Purav Raja and Divij Sharan defeated Chris Guccione and Matt Reid 6–4, 7–5 in the final, to win the title.

Seeds

Draw

Draw

References
 Main Draw

All Japan Indoor Tennis Championships - Doubles
2013 Doubles